Ovçar (in Albanian) or Ovčare (in Serbian: Овчаре) is a village in the municipality of Mitrovica in the District of Mitrovica, Kosovo. According to the 2011 census, it doesn't have any inhabitants.

Notes

References 

Villages in Mitrovica, Kosovo